The Central District of Bagh-e Malek County is a district (bakhsh) in Bagh-e Malek County, Khuzestan Province, Iran. At the 2006 census, its population was 62,217, in 12,044 families.  The District has two cities: Bagh-e Malek and Qaleh Tall.  The District has four rural districts (dehestan): Haparu Rural District, Mongasht Rural District, Qaleh Tall Rural District, and Rud Zard Rural District.

References 

]

Bagh-e Malek County
Districts of Khuzestan Province